Eucosmophora is a genus of moths in the family Gracillariidae.

Species
Eucosmophora aspila Davis & Wagner, 2005
Eucosmophora atlantis (Meyrick, 1924)
Eucosmophora chrysocosma (Meyrick, 1915)
Eucosmophora dives Walsingham, 1897
Eucosmophora echinulata Davis & Wagner, 2005
Eucosmophora eclampsis (Durrant, 1914)
Eucosmophora eurychalca (Meyrick, 1920)
Eucosmophora ingae Davis & Wagner, 2005
Eucosmophora manilkarae Davis & Wagner, 2005
Eucosmophora melanactis (Meyrick, 1915)
Eucosmophora paraguayensis Davis & Wagner, 2005
Eucosmophora pithecollobiae Davis & Wagner, 2005
Eucosmophora pouteriae Davis & Wagner, 2005
Eucosmophora prolata Davis & Wagner, 2005
Eucosmophora schinusivora D.R. Davis & Wheeler, 2011
Eucosmophora sideroxylonella Busck, 1900
Eucosmophora trimetalla (Meyrick, 1915)

External links
Global Taxonomic Database of Gracillariidae (Lepidoptera)

Acrocercopinae
Gracillarioidea genera